Lolá is a corregimiento in Las Palmas District, Veraguas Province, Panama with a population of 946 as of 2010. Its population as of 1990 was 960; its population as of 2000 was 1,022.

References

Corregimientos of Veraguas Province